The 42 is a residential skyscraper in Kolkata, in the state of West Bengal, India. It is located on Chowringhee Road, the central business district of the city, between the Commercial building of Tata Centre and the residential building of Jeevan Sudha. It was first proposed in 2008 but construction was delayed for nearly two years. The construction of the building was completed in 2019, making it the tallest building in the country at that time.

It is the tallest completed building in India outside of Mumbai.

History
The premises originally belonged to the Maharaja of Darbhanga.

Details

Planned by developers Mani Group, Salarpuria Sattva Group, Alcove Realty & Diamond Group, to be Kolkata's tallest residential building. Located on Chowringhee Road, in the middle of the city, the skyscraper has 65 floors.

Protest
The developers of The 42 have faced a civil suit in the Calcutta High Court filed by ITC Limited, the owners of the adjoining 'Fountain Court' property. The suit filed by ITC claims that ITC's right to receive light and air will be violated by the 65-storeyed residential building being constructed to the west of its 'Fountain Court'  property. On 19 August 2013, the Calcutta High Court passed an order that any steps taken by the developers would be subject to the outcome of the case filed by ITC. On 8 May 2014, the Court ordered that the developers of The 42 should not proceed with the construction at a pace to defeat the interests of ITC. (Calcutta High Court, GA Case No 2698 / 2013) The matter is pending before the Calcutta High Court.

Gallery

See also
 List of tallest buildings in Kolkata
 List of tallest buildings in India
 List of tallest buildings and structures in the Indian subcontinent
 List of tallest residential buildings
 List of tallest buildings in the world

References

External links

Building at The Skyscraper Center database

Buildings and structures in Kolkata
Buildings and structures under construction in India
Residential skyscrapers in India